Algrizea is a genus in the plant family Myrtaceae first described as a genus in 2006. The entire genus is endemic to the State of Bahia in northeastern Brazil.

Species
 Algrizea macrochlamys (DC.) Proença & NicLugh. 2006. - Bahia
 Algrizea minor Sobral, Faria & Proença. 2010. - Bahia

References

Myrtaceae
Myrtaceae genera
Endemic flora of Brazil